Richard N. J., also known as Richard Jose is an Indian television actor who appears in Malayalam-language television shows. After making his debut in the 2012 TV series Pattu Saree, he rose to fame by playing the leading role of Jayachandran in the soap opera Karuthamuthu from 2014 to 2017.

Career

Richard made his television debut through Pattu Saree aired in Mazhavil Manorama from 2012 to 2014. He played the parallel lead character of Jayachandran in Asianet's popular soap-opera drama Karuthamuthu. He then appeared in serials, Mizhi Randilum, Ennu Swantham Jani, Mangalyapattu and Mamattikutty. He played a possessive husband, Suryanarayana Varma in television series Sumangali Bhava. He plays a leading fashion designer, Siddharth Narayan in  ongoing drama Pranayavarnangal.

Filmography

Television

Special appearances

References

External links
 

Living people
Indian television actors
Male actors in Malayalam television
Year of birth missing (living people)
Place of birth missing (living people)